The 2009–10 Portland Pilots men's basketball team represented University of Portland in the 2009–10 NCAA Division I men's basketball season. The Pilots were members of the West Coast Conference and were led by fourth-year head coach Eric Reveno. They played their home games at the Chiles Center. They finished the season with 21–11, 10–4 in WCC play and lost in the semifinals in the 2010 West Coast Conference men's basketball tournament to Saint Mary's. They were invited to the 2010 CollegeInsider.com Tournament which they lost to Northern Colorado in the first round.

Roster

2009–10 Schedule and results

|-
!colspan=9 style="background:#461D7C; color:#FFFFFF;"| Exhibition

|-
!colspan=9 style="background:#461D7C; color:#FFFFFF;"| Non-conference regular season

|-
!colspan=9 style="background:#461D7C; color:#FFFFFF;"| WCC regular season

|-
!colspan=9 style="background:#461D7C;"| 2010 WCC tournament

|-
!colspan=9 style="background:#461D7C;"| 2010 CIT

|-

References

Portland
Portland Pilots men's basketball seasons
Portland
Portland Pilots men's basketball
Portland Pilots men's basketball
Portland
Portland